John Wesley Dafoe (8 March 1866 – 9 January 1944) was a Canadian journalist. From 1901 to 1944 he was the editor of the Manitoba Free Press, later named the Winnipeg Free Press. He also wrote several books, including a biography of Sir Wilfrid Laurier.

Dafoe was one of the country's most influential and powerful journalists. During his tenure, the Free Press was among the most important newspapers in Canada and was considered one of the great newspapers of the world. His influence extended to the very centre of Canadian power, both through his writing and his close relations with his employers, the Liberal Sifton family.

In 1919, he did not give unqualified support to the Business side during the strong Labour-Capital confrontation that was the Winnipeg General strike.

He claimed credit for his paper that Winnipeg adopted Single Transferable Voting for city elections in 1920.

Dafoe accompanied Prime Minister William Lyon Mackenzie King to several imperial conferences and was asked by the Prime Minister to sit on the Rowell–Sirois Commission studying federal–provincial relations. Dafoe opposed appeasement of fascist dictators and urged the government to prepare for a major war, which he accurately predicted would begin in 1939.

He advocated free trade policies. 

He refused a consular position in Washington, a knighthood, and a seat in the Senate of Canada. He also declined to stand for Parliament.

His son, Edwin Dafoe, became managing editor of the Free Press and his grandson, John Dafoe, became the editor of The Montreal Star and later editorial page editor of the  Winnipeg Free Press. His grandson Christopher Dafoe was editor of The Beaver.

Works 
 Over the Canadian Battlefields (1919)
 Laurier: A Study in Canadian Politics (1922)
 Canada: An American Nation (1935)

References

Further reading

External links 

 Description of John W. Dafoe's archives at the University of Manitoba Archives & Special Collections
 
 
 

Canadian political commentators
Canadian newspaper editors
Canadian male journalists
Journalists from Manitoba
Journalists from Ontario
1866 births
1944 deaths
Persons of National Historic Significance (Canada)
Presidents of the Canadian Political Science Association